Sialan is a mountain peak in Alborz range in Iran.

Climbing 
The level of difficulty is "walk-up" and the nearest village is Haniz village to the south. There is also a hut at 3270 m for hikers coming from the Southern valley (the direction of Haniz).

References 

Mountains of Iran
Mountaineering in Iran
Mountains of Mazandaran Province
Landforms of Qazvin Province
Four-thousanders of the Alborz